The 1875 Caversham by-election was a by-election held on 20 August 1875 during the 5th New Zealand Parliament in the Caversham electorate in the south-east of the South Island.

The by-election was held because of the death of sitting member of parliament William Tolmie.

The election saw Robert Stout narrowly win the seat by just twenty-one votes over his sole opponent, William Larnach. Both were new to the political arena with neither having stood for Parliament before.

Results
The following table gives the election results:

The results by polling booth were as follows:

Notes

References

By-elections in New Zealand
1875 elections in New Zealand
Politics of Dunedin
August 1875 events
1870s in Dunedin